Taourirt may refer to several places:

Taourirt, Algeria, a village in Bouïra Province, Algeria
Taourirt, Morocco, a town in Taourirt Province, Morocco
Taourirt Province, Morocco
Kasbah Taourirt, a historic site in Ouarzazate, Morocco